"Perfect Bliss" is the debut single of Irish girl group Bellefire, released as the lead single from their first album, After the Rain (2001). Issued in 2001, the song peaked at number two on the Irish Singles Chart in June of the same year, ending the year as Ireland's 23rd-best-performing single. On 2 July 2001, "Perfect Bliss" was released in the United Kingdom, reaching number 18 on the UK Singles Chart.

Music video
The music video was directed by Gregg Masuak with post-production from Chris Dean and Justin Mullender.

Track listings
UK HDCD single
 "Perfect Bliss" – 3:38
 "Don't Let Me Down" – 4:25
 "Dancing Inside" – 3:50
 "Perfect Bliss" (video)

UK cassette single and Japanese CD single
 "Perfect Bliss" – 3:38
 "Don't Let Me Down" – 4:25
 "Dancing Inside" – 3:50

European CD single
 "Perfect Bliss" – 3:38
 "Don't Let Me Down" – 4:25

Credits and personnel
Credits are lifted from the UK CD single liner notes and the After the Rain album booklet.

Studios
 Recorded at Shane Songs Studios (Stockholm, Sweden)
 Strings recorded at Polar Studios (Stockholm, Sweden)
 Mixed in 2001 at Mono Music Studios (Stockholm, Sweden)

Personnel

 Jörgen Elofsson – writing, keyboards, programming, production, arrangement
 Phil Thornalley – writing
 Bellefire – vocals
 Jeanette Olsson – additional backing vocals
 Mathias Venge – guitars, programming, production, arrangement
 Stockholm Session Strings – strings
 Ulf Janssen – string arrangement
 Henrik Janssen – string arrangement
 Håkan Wollgård – recording (strings)
 Bernard Löhr – mixing

Charts

Weekly charts

Year-end charts

Release history

References

2001 debut singles
2001 songs
Bellefire songs
Songs written by Jörgen Elofsson
Songs written by Phil Thornalley
Virgin Records singles